Md. Abdul Kadir (died 10 December 2019) was a Bangladeshi politician from Kishorganj belonging to Awami League. He took part in the Liberation War of Bangladesh. He was elected as a member of the East Pakistan Provincial Assembly.

Biography
Abdul Kadir was elected as a member of the East Pakistan Provincial Assembly in 1970 as an Awami League candidate. In 1971 he took part in the Liberation War of Bangladesh.

Abdul Kadir died on 10 December 2019 in Bangabandhu Sheikh Mujib Medical University Hospital, Dhaka.

References

Awami League politicians
People from Kishoreganj District
People of the Bangladesh Liberation War
1920s births
2019 deaths